In the mathematical field of Riemannian geometry, the Reilly formula is an important identity, discovered by Robert Reilly in 1977.

This is often used in combination with the observation

with the consequence that

Applications include eigenvalue estimates in spectral geometry and the study of submanifolds of constant mean curvature.

References 

 Bennett Chow, Peng Lu, and Lei Ni. Hamilton's Ricci flow. Graduate Studies in Mathematics, 77. American Mathematical Society, Providence, RI; Science Press Beijing, New York, 2006. xxxvi+608 pp. 
 Tobias Holck Colding and William P. Minicozzi II. A course in minimal surfaces. Graduate Studies in Mathematics, 121. American Mathematical Society, Providence, RI, 2011. xii+313 pp. . 
 Peter Li. Geometric analysis. Cambridge Studies in Advanced Mathematics, 134. Cambridge University Press, Cambridge, 2012. x+406 pp. .  
 
 R. Schoen and S.-T. Yau. Lectures on differential geometry. Lecture notes prepared by Wei Yue Ding, Kung Ching Chang, Jia Qing Zhong and Yi Chao Xu. Translated from the Chinese by Ding and S.Y. Cheng. With a preface translated from the Chinese by Kaising Tso. Conference Proceedings and Lecture Notes in Geometry and Topology, I. International Press, Cambridge, MA, 1994. v+235 pp.

External links 
 In Memoriam Robert Cunningham Reilly
Differential geometry